Red Oak Brewery is a brewing company in Whitsett, North Carolina. Originally started as a brewpub in Greensboro, NC, Red Oak produces only unfiltered, unpasteurized Bavarian Style lagers. Red Oak beer is only distributed in North Carolina.

Unlike most beer brands, Red Oak is self distributed.

History
In February 1991, the Red Oak brewpub was opened in Greensboro. As the beer grew in popularity and distribution, production needs exceeded the brewpub’s capacity. In summer 2007 the new modern computerized brewery was opened in the nearby community of Whitsett and the brewpub closed. Today, it claims to be the largest craft lager-only brewery in the United States.

The brewery began bottling 12-packs of beer in late 2009 after a $1 million expansion, including a new bottling line. The brewery is capable of producing 60,000 barrels a year.

In December 2017, the Red Oak Brewery opened their Lager Haus & Biergarten next to their brewery.

German influence
All Red Oak beer is made according to the 1516 Bavarian Purity Law known as the Reinheitsgebot. The beer is unfiltered, unpasteurized and without preservatives. Red Oak kegs in European sizes- measured by the liter.

Products
 Red Oak (flagship, amber lager) 
 Battlefield Bock
 Hummin' Bird (Helles lager)
 Big Oak (Spring Seasonal Vienna Style Bockbier)
 Old Oak (Fall Seasonal Oktoberfest Style)
 Black Oak (Winter Seasonal Double Bock)
 1516  Heller Bock)
 Red Oak HopGarten Bavarian Pils)

References

External links
 Red Oak Brewery - Official Website
 Red Oak pushes for higher self distribution cap - News & Record (bad link)

American beer brands
Companies based in North Carolina
Beer brewing companies based in North Carolina
American companies established in 1991
Food and drink companies established in 1991